L'Exigence is a 2016 political book about terrorism authored by Manuel Valls, the Prime Minister of France. All proceeds go to the victims of the November 2015 Paris attacks.

Content
The book comprises a preface authored by Prime Minister Valls, followed by the two speeches he gave before the National Assembly on January 7, 2015 and November 13, 2015. The main theme is terrorism.

Promotional efforts
Prime Minister Valls promoted the book on On n'est pas couché, a French television programme on France 2, on January 16, 2016.

References

Political books
French-language books
Books about terrorism
November 2015 Paris attacks
2016 non-fiction books
Éditions Grasset books